Madame Saqui (born Marguerite-Antoinette Lalanne on February 26, 1786 in  Agde, Hérault ; February 21, 1866) was a noted French tightrope walker or "rope dancer." For a time she had her own theatre, which she had re-decorated. She continued to perform into her seventies. In her day, she was something of a celebrity and is mentioned in the novel Vanity Fair by William Makepeace Thackeray.

In 1907, the French journalist Paul Ginisty wrote her biography: Mémoires d'un danseuse de corde : Mme Saqui (1786-1866).

References 

1786 births
1866 deaths
People from Agde
French stunt performers
Tightrope walkers
Women stunt performers
Burials at Père Lachaise Cemetery
19th-century circus performers